The Romance of Book and Sword (released as Jiangnan Shujian Qing, 江南書劍情 in mainland China) is a 1987 Hong Kong film by Ann Hui, based on Louis Cha's novel The Book and the Sword. The film was followed by Princess Fragrance, released later in the same month and also directed by Ann Hui. The films are among the earliest Hong Kong films to be completely shot in mainland China with a full mainland Chinese cast.

Plot
The film covers the first half of the novel and ends with the truce between the Qianlong Emperor and the Red Flower Society at Liuhe Pagoda. The two major subplots in the novel are omitted: Li Yuanzhi and Zhou Qi do not appear in the film.

Cast
Zhang Duofu as Chen Jialuo
Jiang Wei as young Chen Jialuo
Chang Dashi as Qianlong Emperor
Liu Jia as Huoqingtong
Ding Cuihua as Luo Bing
Lü Yongquan as Taoist Wuchen
Yu Dalu as Zhao Banshan
Guo Bichuan as Wen Tailai
Wang Jingqiu as Zhang Jin
Hou Changrong as Yu Yutong
Chen Youwang as Xu Tianhong
Ren Naichang as Shi Shuangying
Zhang Jun as Chang Bozhi
Wang Wei as Chang Hezhi
Zheng Jianhua as Jiang Sigen
Fu Yongcai as Wei Chunhua
Sun Chenxi as Xinyan
Wang Hongtao as Yu Wanting
Wu Chunsheng as Zhang Zhaozhong
Yang Junsheng as Heshen
Ding Tao as Zhaohui
Deng Jie as Chen Jialuo's mother
Ge Lili as Qinghua
Zhu Yi as Prince Su
Zhang Xuehao as Li Kexiu
Wang Wensheng as Long Jun
Shi Wei as Wet nurse

External links

1987 films
Films directed by Ann Hui
Hong Kong martial arts films
Films based on The Book and the Sword
Wuxia films
Films about rebels
1980s Hong Kong films